Agladrillia macella is a species of sea snail, a marine gastropod mollusk in the family Drilliidae.

Description
The length of the shell attains 17.2 mm, its diameter 5 mm.

Distribution
The holotype has been found off South Africa. The given type locality is unlikely as the holotype does not resemble anything known from the South African littoral. The referral to Agladrillia is speculative.

References

Endemic fauna of South Africa
macella
Gastropods described in 1923